Peter Claver Cullen (born July 28, 1941) is a Canadian voice actor. He is notable for voicing Optimus Prime in the original 1980s Transformers animated series, returning to role in Transformers media in 2007, starting with the first live-action film. He has also voiced many other characters across a wide variety of popular media, including Eeyore in the Winnie the Pooh franchise, Monterey Jack in Chip 'n Dale Rescue Rangers, the first voice of KARR in Knight Rider and the vocalizations of the title character in Predator.

Early life
Cullen was born on July 28, 1941, in Montreal, Quebec, to Henry and Muriel (née McCann) Cullen. He is of Irish descent. He has three siblings: Michaela, Sonny, and Larry. He is a member of the first graduating class of the National Theatre School of Canada, which he graduated in 1963. His brother, Larry Cullen, was a retired Captain in the United States Marine Corps, and helped inspire the voice of Optimus Prime.

Career

1960s–1970s
In 1968, he and Joan Stuart appeared as "Giles" and "Penelope" in L'Anglaise, a recurring segment about a French-Canadian man with an English-Canadian wife, on the CBC Radio comedy series, Funny You Should Say That.

Cullen played a French-Canadian astronaut character named Commander Bi Bi Latuque alongside Ted Zeigler for the 1969 children's show, The Buddies on CFCF-TV in Montreal. He honed his voice skills by working as a radio announcer, notably in his home town of Montreal on (then) MOR station CKGM doing the overnight and weekend swing shifts. From 1967 to 1969, he was the announcer for Smothers Brothers Comedy Hour.

From 1971 to 1974, he, Zeigler and Billy Van were series regulars on The Sonny & Cher Comedy Hour. In 1974, Cullen was the announcer and a series regular (with Ted Zeigler and Billy Van) on The Hudson Brothers Razzle Dazzle Show. He lent his voice to a character in the album "The Story of Halloween Horror" in 1977.

As Optimus Prime
Cullen recalls auditioning for the role of the robot superhero Optimus Prime at a casting house in Burbank, California, explaining that as he read Prime's character breakdown, he saw that it was "the opportunity of the year", and heeded his brother Larry's advice: "Peter, don't be a Hollywood hero, be a real hero. Real heroes don't yell and act tough; they're tough enough to be gentle, so control yourself." Cullen later learned from his agent, Steve Tisherman, that he not only won the part of Prime, but also, to his surprise, the role of Ironhide as well, which he saw as a "home run".

He has stated that Optimus is his favorite voice role, and that he based the voice of the Autobot leader on his older brother Larry, who served in Vietnam. "When he came home, I could see a change. He was quieter and he was a man and a superhero to me," says the actor. "I watched him and listened to him. I'd never had an opportunity to do a superhero, and when that came, [that voice] just came right out of me and I sounded like Optimus."

He has also stated that he had no idea of Prime's popularity until the character's controversial death in the 1986 animated film, because the studio had never given him fan letters from children addressed to Optimus. The public backlash over Optimus's death surprised producers greatly. Children were leaving the theaters distraught because of the character's death. The writers temporarily revived the character for a single episode in Season 3 called "Dark Awakening". Initially, this was intended to be his final appearance, but after fan requests continued, "The Return of Optimus Prime", a two-part episode was produced. The original ending of "Dark Awakening" was altered in reruns to include a teaser about the return of the character, and indeed, Optimus returned once and for all to lead the Autobots for the final five episodes of the original American cartoon series.

Cullen reprised the role of Optimus Prime in the 2007 Transformers live-action film, the sequels Revenge of the Fallen, Dark of the Moon, Age of Extinction and The Last Knight, the spin-off Bumblebee and the forthcoming Rise of the Beasts and the video games based on the film series. Though he was only contractually obligated to voice Optimus up to The Last Knight, producer Lorenzo di Bonaventura stated in 2021 that Cullen was welcome to voice the character for as long as he wanted.

Cullen again reprised his role as Optimus Prime in the video games Transformers: War for Cybertron, Transformers: Fall of Cybertron and Transformers: Devastation, and in the recent television series Transformers: Rescue Bots, Transformers: Prime and Transformers: Robots in Disguise. His performance in the premiere season of Transformers: Prime earned him a nomination for a 2011 Daytime Emmy Award in the Outstanding Performer in an Animated Program category.

Other work

In the 1980s and 1990s, Cullen appeared on a number of television shows. He has played Coran, Stride the Tiger Fighter, and King Alfor in the Lion Voltron series, the transforming spaceship/robot Ramrod, the heroic Commander Eagle and the villainous Nemesis in the 1980s anime series Saber Rider and the Star Sheriffs, Commander James Hawkins in the Vehicle Voltron series, Eeyore in the Winnie the Pooh franchise, Original First Voice of KARR in Knight Rider, Antor and Bomba, and Gunner, in Dino-Riders, Airborne, Zandar and Nemesis Enforcer in G.I. Joe, He played Mantor/Mantys in Coleco's 5 episode mini-series Sectaurs in 1986; Red Skull in the 1981 cartoon series of Spider-Man, Klaar and Zanzoar in Megas XLR and Mantus in The Pirates of Dark Water. He also had a voice part in the 1984 motion picture Gremlins (as a gremlin) and in the first season of the 2008 Knight Rider series, where he reprised his vocal role as KARR (from the original Knight Rider series). He also did voicework in The Greatest Adventure: Stories from the Bible series, notably as Japheth, one of Noah's sons in the "Noah's Ark" episode, and the King of Nineveh in the "Jonah" episode. He was well known by some as the main villain Venger in the animated series of Dungeons and Dragons. He played the evil sorcerer Renwick in the lesser known series Little Wizards and played Cindarr in the short-lived series Visionaries: Knights of the Magical Light.

Among many other television series and films, he has also lent his basso voice to many film trailers and television commercials, including announcing for the Toonami and You Are Here blocks on the Cartoon Network. Cullen spent some of his early professional years in Montreal as a radio announcer/DJ on CKGM; and as a character in a then-popular local television kids show. He acted the role of a French-Canadian astronaut, along with writer and his partner on the show, Ted Ziegler. Both Ziegler and Cullen were in the supporting cast of The Sonny & Cher Comedy Hour, as well as other network comedies of the era.

He voiced Nintendo's mascot Mario in the Donkey Kong segments on Saturday Supercade, making him the first person to ever provide a voice for the character in western media.

Cullen has done voicework on drum and bass DJ Dieselboy's 2004 album, The Dungeonmaster's Guide, and narration on the 2013 album Tetragrammaton by the Dutch extreme metal band The Monolith Deathcult. Tetragrammaton also featured Cullen on bass in "God's Among Insects." Additionally, he did voicework for the unreleased Blizzard Entertainment game Warcraft Adventures: Lord of the Clans, and provided narration for the Star Wars fan film series I.M.P.S.: The Relentless.

Cullen is a voice announcer on Police Story 4: First Strike in advertisements for New Line Cinema, lending his experience as an ex-cop for the Santa Monica division to the cast.

He has also done voice work for promotions of the 1999 film "The Iron Giant"

Personal life
Cullen has four children: Clay, Angus, Claire, Pilar and three grandchildren. He is a good friend of his longtime Transformers co-star and fellow voice actor Frank Welker, in contrast to the rivalry of their respective characters.

Cullen is a devoted fan and supporter of NASA, citing the Apollo 11 moon-landing of 1969 as the start of his interest. As such, he sees the interaction between Optimus Prime and Buzz Aldrin in Dark of the Moon one of his proudest moments.

Honours
At BotCon 2010, Hasbro named Cullen as one of the first four human inductees in the Transformers Hall of Fame for his role as the voice of Optimus Prime.

Filmography

Film

Television

Video games

Live-action

Theme park rides

Awards and nominations

References

External links

 
 
 

1941 births
Living people
Anglophone Quebec people
Canadian expatriate male actors in the United States
Canadian male film actors
Canadian male television actors
Canadian male video game actors
Canadian male voice actors
Canadian people of Irish descent
Canadian sketch comedians
Comedians from Montreal
Male actors from Montreal
National Theatre School of Canada alumni
20th-century Canadian male actors
21st-century Canadian male actors
American male film actors
American male television actors
American male video game actors
American male voice actors
American people of Irish descent
American sketch comedians